Wayne is a given name that derives from the surname Wayne. It may refer to:

 Wayne Allwine (1947–2009), American voice actor
 Wayne Arnold (born 1984), American professional basketball player
 Wayne K. Blickenstaff (1920–2011), American World War II flying ace
 Wayne Brady (born 1972), American actor
 Wayne Maurice Caron (1946–1968), Vietnam War Medal of Honor recipient
 Wayne Cochran (1939–2017), American singer
 Wayne M. Collins (1899–1974), American civil rights attorney
 Wayne Couzens (born 1972), British convicted murderer and former police officer
 Wayne Coyne (born 1961), American musician
 Wayne Fontana (1945–2020), English rock and pop singer
 Wayne Fuller (born 1931), American statistician
 Wayne Gallman (born 1994), American football player
 Wayne Gretzky (born 1961), Canadian former professional ice hockey player
 Wayne Hendrickson (born 1941) American biophysicist and University professor at Columbia
 Wayne Knight (born 1955), American actor
 Wayne Kramer (disambiguation), several people
 Wayne Millner (1913–1976), American football player
 Wayne Mixson (1922–2020), American politician
 Wayne Newton (born 1942), American singer and entertainer
 Wayne O'Sullivan (born 1974), Irish football manager
Wayne Panton, Caymanian Premier
 Wayne Pivac (born 1962), New Zealand rugby union coach
 Wayne Rogers (1933–2015), American actor 
 Wayne "Tree" Rollins (born 1955), American former basketball player 
 Wayne Rooney (born 1985), English professional footballer and manager
 Wayne Rosing (born 1946), American engineering manager
 Wayne Selden Jr. (born 1994), American basketball player in the Israeli Basketball Premier League
 Wayne Sermon (born 1984), American musician
 Wayne Shorter (1933–2023), American jazz saxophonist and composer
 Wayne Simmonds (born 1988), Canadian professional ice hockey player in NHL
 Wayne Sleep (born 1948), British dancer
 Wayne Static (1965–2014), American musician
 Wayne Thiebaud (1920–2021), American painter
 Wayne Weaver (born 1935), American businessman
 Wayne Williams (born 1958), American murderer and possible serial killer

Fictional characters
 Wayne Campbell, from the Saturday Night Live sketch "Wayne's World" and subsequent films
 Wayne Cramp, the protagonist of The Cramp Twins
 Wayne, a character in 6teen, an animated sitcom
 Wayne, a character in The Bash Street Kids
 Wayne Szalinski, main character in the Honey I Shrunk the Kids trilogy
 Wayne Arnold, one of the main characters in The Wonder Years
 Wayne, the main character of the indie video game Hylics.